Zapan-Nova is a rural locality (a settlement) in Ferapontovskoye Rural Settlement, Kirillovsky District, Vologda Oblast, Russia. The population was 147 as of 2002.

Geography 
Zapan-Nova is located 23 km northeast of Kirillov (the district's administrative centre) by road. Nefedyevo is the nearest rural locality.

References 

Rural localities in Kirillovsky District